Tatlock may refer to:

 Tatlock, Ontario, community in township of Lanark Highlands, Ontario

People
Alison Tatlock, executive producer and writer of US TV series Better Call Saul
 Eleanor Tatlock (1769–18330, English poet
 Jean Tatlock (1914-1944), American psychiatrist, daughter of J.S.P. Tatlock
 J. S. P. Tatlock (1876-1948), American literary scholar and medievalist, full name John Strong Perry Tatlock
 Robert Rattray Tatlock (1889–1954), Scottish writer and art critic
 Shannon Tatlock (born 1984), Canadian curler

Fictional characters
 In television series Coronation Street:
 Albert Tatlock
 Valerie Tatlock, a.k.a. Valerie Barlow
 Tatlock, any of several in film Miss Tatlock's Millions
 Tatlock, in two series-14 episodes of ChuckleVision television series
 Tatlock, a minor character in the novel Invisible Man

See also
TATLOCK strain, bacterium